The Digital Performance Right in Sound Recordings Act of 1995 (DPRA) is a United States Copyright law that grants owners of a copyright in sound recordings an exclusive right “to perform the copyrighted work publicly by means of a digital audio transmission.”  The DPRA was enacted in response to the absence of a performance right for sound recordings in the Copyright Act of 1976 and a fear that digital technology would stand in for sales of physical records.   The performance right for sound recordings under the DPRA is limited to transmissions over a digital transmission, so it is not as expansive as the performance right for other types of copyrighted works.   The Digital Millennium Copyright Act (DMCA), enacted in 1998, modified the DPRA.

Three-tier System
The DPRA categorizes services under three tiers, based on the service’s potential impact on record sales.   First, non-subscription broadcast transmissions are exempt from requirements to pay license fees. Second, non-interactive Internet transmissions are required to pay a statutory license established by the Copyright Board. Third, Interactive Internet transmission services are required to negotiate a license agreement with the copyright holder.

The DMCA modified the requirement and framework for the statutory license.

Criticism
While the DPRA expanded the sound recording’s performance right, performers have still criticized the DPRA’s comparative inequity because composers still have a much wider performance right than performers.  Broadcast services have criticized the DPRA’s burden on webcasters, since the three-tiered system places a higher burden on the interactive Internet transmission services.   Both sides have criticized the convoluted structure of the DPRA.

References

United States copyright law